Torre (plurals torri and torres) means tower in seven Romance languages (Portuguese, Spanish, Galician, Catalan, Italian, Occitan and Corsican) and may refer to:

Biology 
 Muir-Torre syndrome, the inherited cancer syndrome
 Sypharochiton torri, a mollusc

Chess 
 Carlos Torre Repetto, Mexican chess grandmaster
 Torre Attack, an opening in chess
 Eugenio Torre (born 1951), Filipino chess grandmaster 
 An alternative name for a rook in chess

Places

Brazil 
 Torre, a neighborhood in the metropolitan area of Recife

England 
 Torre, Torquay, an area of Torquay in Devon
 Torre, Somerset, a hamlet in the county of Somerset

France 
 Torre, Corsica

Italy 
 Torre Annunziata, a comune in the province of Naples in the region of Campania
 Torre Archirafi, a frazione in the comune of Riposto in the province of Catania in the region of Sicily
 Torre Boldone, a comune in the province of Bergamo in the region of Lombardy
 Torre Bormida, a comune in the province of Cuneo in the region Piedmont
 Torre Canavese, a comune in the province of Turin in the region Piedmont
 Torre de' Busi, a comune in the province of Lecco in the region Lombardy
 Torre del Greco, a comune in the province of Naples in the region of Campania
 Torre Mondovì, a comune in the province of Cuneo in the region Piedmont
 Torre Pallavicina, a comune in the province of Bergamo in the region of Lombardy
 Torre Pellice, a comune in the province of Turin in the region Piedmont
Other variants
 Torri del Benaco, a comune in the province of Verona in the region of Veneto
 Torri di Quartesolo, a comune in the province of Vicenza in the region of Veneto
 Torri in Sabina, a comune in the province of Rieti in the Italian of Latium
 Torri Superiore, a medieval village in the commune of Ventimiglia in the province of Imperia in the region of Liguria
 Campolongo al Torre, a commune in the province of Udine in the region of Friuli-Venezia Giulia
 Largo di Torre Argentina, a square in the ancient Campus Martius, Rome
 San Vito al Torre, a comune in the province of Udine in the region of Friuli-Venezia Giulia

Mexico 
 Martínez de la Torre, Veracruz, a municipality in the State of Veracruz

Portugal
 Torre (Amares), a civil parish in the municipality of Amares

Puerto Rico
 Torre, Sabana Grande, Puerto Rico, a barrio

Spain 
 Torre (Treviño), a hamlet
 La Torre, a municipality in the province of Ávila, autonomous community of Castile and León
 Torre Alháquime, a village in the province of Cádiz, autonomous community of Andalusia
 Torre-Cardela, a municipality in the province of Granada, autonomous community of Andalusia
 Torre de Arcas, a municipality in the province of Teruel, autonomous community of Aragon
 Torre de las Arcas, a municipality in the province of Teruel, autonomous community of Aragon
 Torre del Compte, a municipality in the Matarraña/Matarranya in the province of Teruel, autonomous community of Aragon
 Torre los Negros, a municipality in the Matarraña/Matarranya in the province of Teruel, autonomous community of Aragon
 Torre-Pacheco, a municipality in the autonomous region of Murcia
 Torre de Loizaga, a Castle in the autonomous community of the Basque Country

Switzerland 
 Torre, Switzerland, a municipality in the district of Blenio, canton of Ticino

Geographic features

Elevations 
 Cerro Torre, a mountain in the Patagonian Ice Field
 Torre de Aspa, an elevation on the coast of Portugal
 Torre de Cerredo, a peak in Spain
 Torre (Serra da Estrela), the highest point of mainland Portugal

Islands 
 Torre Astura, an island near Anzio

Streams 
 Torre River, a tributary of the Isonzo

Structures

Modern skyscrapers 
 Torre Agbar, a building in Barcelona, Spain
 Torre Bicentenario, planned and cancelled building of Mexico City
 Torre Caja Madrid, a new skyscraper in Madrid, Spain
 Torre Caney, planned skyscraper of the Dominican Republic
 Torre de Collserola, uniquely designed tower in Barcelona
 Torre de Cristal (disambiguation), multiple structures
 Torre Espacio, a new skyscraper in Madrid, Spain
 Torre Europa (disambiguation), multiple structures
 Torre Fundadores, planned skyscraper of Monterrey, Mexico
 Torre Latinoamericana, a building in Mexico City, Mexico
 Torre Mapfre, skyscraper in Barcelona
 Torre Mayor, skyscraper of Mexico City
 Torre Picasso, a skyscraper in Madrid, Spain

Telecommunications towers 
 Torre Entel, located in Santiago, Chile
 Torre España, located in Madrid

Tramway towers 
 Torre Jaume I, tramway tower of Barcelona
 Torre Sant Sebastia, tramway tower in Barcelona

Other 
 Torre degli Asinelli, the highest of the Towers of Bologna in Italy
 Torre Abbey, a building in Britain
 Torre Ader, monumental tower of Buenos Aires
 Torre della Ghirlandina, a bell-tower in Italy
 Torre del Oro, medieval watchtower in Seville
 Torre di Moravola, hotel in Umbria Italy
 Torre railway station, in the United Kingdom
 Torre (WSMR) railway station, also in the United Kingdom
 Torri, structures from which the Torréen Culture on Corsica is named
 Torre.co, website

Other uses
 Torre (name)
 Torre, one of 17 contrade of Siena

See also 
 Torres (disambiguation)